Badhen may refer to:
An alternative spelling of any of Badhan (disambiguation)
An alternative spelling of Badchen

See also